Stephanie Nguyen may refer to:

Stephanie Nguyen (dancer) (born 1986), a Danish dancer
Stephanie Nguyen (politician), a member of the California State Assembly